Philip Williams (1869 – October 31, 1942) was a decorated Captain of the United States Navy and one-time military Governor of the United States Virgin Islands.

Williams entered the United States Naval Academy in 1889, became an Ensign in 1891, a lieutenant junior grade in 1894, and a lieutenant in 1897. He served in the Spanish–American War and commanded  during World War I, for which he received the Navy Cross. From 1922 to 1924, he commanded , before being appointed as Governor of the United States Virgin Islands.

Time as governor
During his turn as governor, the previous governments of the islands were criticized for not doing enough to fortify the islands as a military base. Political pressure was also mounting as the Colonial Council, the local government body, voted to request greater authority over the islands but were denied. (The rationale being that they did not suffer from "taxation without representation" because the amount paid in taxes by the Islanders were less than the amount of support received yearly from the Federal government.)

On August 28, 1924, a hurricane swept through the islands, resulting in four deaths and one person still missing, all on St. John. In addition, 300–400 houses were destroyed and the American Red Cross sent $5,000 (approximately $54,000 in 2005 dollars) in aid. The nearby British island of Tortola suffered many more casualties and resources were dispatched from the US Virgin Islands to assist.

Williams resigned as Governor due to health problems in 1926 and retired from the Navy in 1927. Following his retirement, he continued to work with the Navy and authored several textbooks using in the academy.

See also

References
"Only Four are Killed on Virgin Islands." The Atlanta Constitution (1881–2001). Atlanta, Ga.: Sep 4, 1924. pg. 6, 1 pgs
"New Governor of Virgin Islands." Los Angeles Times. Los Angeles, Calif.: Aug 7, 1925. pg. 2, 1 pgs
"What To Do With The Virgin Islands? Valesku Bari." The North American Review. Boston: Dec 1925 – Feb 1926. Iss. NO. 829;  pg. 266, 8 pgs
"Capt. Williams Dies in Naval Hospital." The Washington Post. Washington, D.C.: Nov 2, 1942. pg. B5, 1 pgs
"Captain Williams, Insular Ex-Head." Special to The New York Times. New York Times. New York, N.Y.: Nov 4, 1942. pg. 23, 1 pgs

External links

1869 births
1942 deaths
Governors of the United States Virgin Islands
United States Navy officers
Recipients of the Navy Cross (United States)
United States Navy personnel of World War I